Auguste Bailly (1878–1967) was a French novelist and historian. Several of his works have been adapted into films, particularly his 1924 novel Naples au baiser de feu which has had four screen adaptations including the 1954 Hollywood film Flame and the Flesh. As a historian he made a particular study of the relationship between Louis XIII of France and his wife Anne of Austria.

References

Bibliography
 Goble, Alan. The Complete Index to Literary Sources in Film. Walter de Gruyter, 1999.
 MacDonald, Roger. The Man in the Iron Mask: The True Story of the Most Famous Prisoner in History and the Four Musketeers. Constable, 2005.

1878 births
1967 deaths
French novelists
20th-century French historians
Writers from Paris